Shuldikha is a rural locality (a village) in Dubrovskoye Rural Settlement, Yelovsky District, Perm Krai, Russia. The population was 263 as of 2010. There are 2 streets.

Geography 
Shuldikha is located 28 km west of Yelovo (the district's administrative centre) by road. It is off of the Kama River. Dubrovo is the nearest rural locality.

References 

Rural localities in Yelovsky District